Engine House No. 18 is a fire station in the West Adams section of Los Angeles, California. 

Built in 1904, the station was designed in the Mission Revival style by architect John Parkinson, whose later works included Los Angeles City Hall, Union Station, and Bullocks Wilshire. In 1915, Engine House No. 18 was one of a dozen stations closed because of budget cutbacks resulting from the "two-platoon ordinance" passed by the Los Angeles City Council in 1915. The station re-opened in 1920 and remained an operating fire station until 1968. In 1932, former fireman James F. Fourong was arrested for burglarizing Engine House No. 18. Fourong had looted other fire stations by phoning in false alarms and then entering the firehouse while the men responded to the call. In February 1932, Fourong attempted a robbery at Engine House No. 18 but was surprised by a fireman while burglarizing the lockers. After the building had been vacant for sixteen years, the Community Redevelopment Agency in 1984 agreed to a $28,000 contract with Woodford & Bernard, architects, to prepare construction documents for the restoration of Engine House No. 18. The plan was to restore and convert the firehouse into a community-oriented professional training center at a cost of $225,000.

Through a competitive bidding process that began in December 2009, the Community Redevelopment Agency of the City of Los Angeles (CRA/LA) awarded the Exceptional Children's Foundation (ECF) the opportunity to purchase Engine House No. 18. ECF purchased the property in 2011 with the goal of converting the cultural landmark into a fine arts training center for adults with special needs and a community creative space for the residents of South Los Angeles.

Renovations of the site began in June 2012. ECF re-opened Engine House No. 18 as its South L.A. Art Center in the spring of 2013. Approximately 50 participants with developmental disabilities annually are provided with daily fine art instruction, life skills training, and case management services at this location. The center also hosts exhibits of the participants' artwork along with creations by other community artists.

See also
List of Registered Historic Places in Los Angeles
List of Los Angeles Historic-Cultural Monuments in South Los Angeles
Los Angeles Fire Department
Los Angeles Fire Department Museum and Memorial

References

External links

 Los Angeles Fire Department Historical Archive: Fire Station 18 Photo Gallery
 

Buildings and structures in Los Angeles
Defunct fire stations in California
West Adams, Los Angeles
Fire stations completed in 1904
Los Angeles Historic-Cultural Monuments
Fire stations on the National Register of Historic Places in Los Angeles
John and Donald Parkinson buildings
Mission Revival architecture in California